The men's 4 x 100 metres relay event at the 1994 European Athletics Championships was held in Helsinki, Finland, at Helsinki Olympic Stadium on 13 August 1994.

Medalists

Results

Final
13 August

Heats
13 August

Heat 1

Heat 2

Participation
According to an unofficial count, 46 athletes from 11 countries participated in the event.

 (4)
 (4)
 (4)
 (4)
 (4)
 (4)
 (5)
 (4)
 (5)
 (4)
 (4)

References

4 x 100 metres relay
Relays at the European Athletics Championships